Thankam may refer to: 

 "Ente Thankam", a short story written by Vaikom Muhammad Basheer re-published under the name "Thankam"
 Thankam (film), a 2023 Indian Malayalam-language film
 Kumari Thankam, Indian actress
 Pala Thankam, Indian actress

See also 
 Kalanjukittiya Thankam, a 1964 Indian Malayalam-language film